Ondores District is one of four districts of the province Junín in Peru.

See also 
 Upamayu Dam

References